The 1961 Eastern Illinois Panthers football team represented Eastern Illinois University as a member of the Interstate Intercollegiate Athletic Conference (IIAC) during the 1961 NCAA College Division football season. The team was led by fifth-year head coach Ralph Kohl and played their home games at Lincoln Field in Charleston, Illinois. The Panthers finished the season with a 4–3–1 record overall and a 3–2–1 record in conference play.

Schedule

References

Eastern Illinois
Eastern Illinois Panthers football seasons
Eastern Illinois Panthers football